Heron Academy (formerly The Michael Tippett School) is a special needs secondary school for students with severe learning difficulties located in south London. It was previously named after the composer Michael Tippett.  The building was designed by Marks Barfield Architect and completed in 2008. It can accommodate 80 students between the age of 11 and 19. 

It was built as part of the Building Schools for the Future programme and was the first school in London and the first special needs school in the country to be completed under the programme.

Previously a community school administered by Lambeth London Borough Council, In February 2023 The Michael Tippett School converted to academy status and was renamed Heron Academy. The school is now sponsored by the London South East Academies Trust.

References

External links
 School website
 Lambeth school profile
 Young Lambeth school profile
 Ofsted reports for The Michael Tippett School
 School Profile on Edubase

Special secondary schools in England
Special schools in the London Borough of Lambeth
Academies in the London Borough of Lambeth